Sea Racketeers is a 1937 American film directed by Hamilton MacFadden and starring Weldon Heyburn, Jeanne Madden, and Warren Hymer.

Plot summary

Cast 
Weldon Heyburn as Chief Bos'n Mate Jim Wilson
Jeanne Madden as Patricia 'Pat' Collins
Warren Hymer as Mate 'Spud' Jones
Penny Singleton as Florence 'Toots' Riley
J. Carrol Naish as Harry Durant
Joyce Compton as Blondie
Charles Trowbridge as Maxwell Gordon
Syd Saylor as Henchman Weasel
Lane Chandler as Lt. Hays (radio voice) / Insp. L. McGrath
Benny Burt as Henchman Maxie
Ralph Sanford as Henchman Turk
Don Rowan as Henchman Lew
Bryant Washburn as Wilbur Crane

Soundtrack 
 Penny Singleton (as Dorothy McNulty) "The Lady Wants To Dance"
 Jeanne Madden - "What Do You Say?"
 Jeanne Madden - "Let's Finish the Dream"
 Jeanne Madden - "Even Since Adam and Eve"

External links 

1937 films
1937 crime drama films
Films about the United States Coast Guard
Films directed by Hamilton MacFadden
American black-and-white films
Republic Pictures films
American crime drama films
1930s English-language films
1930s American films